Outpost for Hope is listed nationally and international as an educational and support resource for "under-represented missing persons and those who seek to find them". 

It has been in operation since 1999 and has 501(c)(3) tax exempt status. This charity specializes in providing resources for the families and Law Enforcement agencies who deal with endangered runaways such as foster children, homeless  and transient persons, lost mentally ill persons, addicts and other high-risk missing persons who for various reasons cannot or have not been reported missing. The resources include guides and visual tools that describe what a family should do when one of their relatives or friends goes missing but the police or other agencies cannot or will not take a missing persons' report. For agencies it provides educational studies, resources and guides in dealing with these cases.

On their website, Outpost For Hope lists various reasons of why a person cannot be reported missing in the United States and other countries. These include, but are not limited to, a person who is over 18 years of age and has a history of going missing or is suspected of being voluntarily missing, foster kids who are habitual runaways, illegal immigrants, prostitutes and other transient people who are not easily missed.

Mission 

 Defining the problem of unreported missing children and adults: the kids off the grid.
 Supporting the efforts of families in crisis, law enforcement and affiliated agencies to locate and provide recovery information that saves lives.  
 To educate society about the mis-perceptions of mental illness, drug addiction, and homelessness and their ripple effects.  Reducing the stigma about these conditions which create opportunities for people to be lost and for predators to exploit them without anyone noticing.   
 Helping families with tools that allows them to find their missing relatives or friends. It also trains and provides informational material to law enforcement and other agencies which allows these individuals and agencies to deal with the families of Unreported missing persons as well as finding ways to get them officially listed.
 Researching the scale and solutions for this social problem by gathering and analyzing information using "The Missing Link Registry".
 Providing social awareness campaigns such as "The Perception Project".
 Working with and supporting other organizations such as Project EDAN, the Doe Network, and Lets Bring Them Home.

Structure 
Outpost for Hope is a 501(c) (3) nonprofit online organization based in Sacramento, California serving the United States.  Founded in 1999 by Libba Phillips after her own sister went missing and she could not  get her listed as missing. It focuses on the location and recovery of Unreported missing persons and is defining the problem of unreported missing children and adults: whom they call the "kids off the grid."

Workers: The charity is run by volunteers.

Finances: Income is through donations from members of the public as well as the sale of promotional items.  They also have paperback options of their free online guides for sale.

Service Area: As an online organization, their tools and information are available worldwide, but it is mainly aimed at the United States.

Servicing: The families of Unreported missing persons, Law Enforcement and other Social and Health Care agencies.

Unreported Missing Persons 

This charity calls all Unreported Missing persons the "Kids Off The Grid" a term first coined by Libba Phillips.

The term applies whether the missing person is a child or an adult. "Unreported" means the missing person is not part of the National Crime Information Center database of missing persons.

People can become Kids Off The Grid or "unreported missing" for a variety of reasons, including:

 the lost/missing person may be estranged from family or friends. 
 law enforcement may not take a "missing" report, or will stop investigations if they believe that the person is "voluntarily missing".
 the lost/missing person may be in this country illegally. 
 the person may be an unknown dependent child of an unreported missing adult or teen. 
 the person might be the victim of an undiscovered crime, such as the victims of serial killer Gary Ridgway.

Social Programs

The Missing Link Registry

This registry is for families who have not been able to register their missing loved ones in any official lists. The aim of the registry is to gather actual data that can be used as case studies for policy making as well as training of Law Enforcement and other related agencies and the future development of prevention strategies.

The registry takes data relating to the reasons why the missing person could not be registered with Law Enforcement. It also keeps a record of the missing persons' state of mind and health at the time of disappearance. Other details contained in their registry form are whether the person had children, if they had known drug issues and whether they were homeless or institutionalized at the time of disappearance.

One aspect of this registry that is not covered is the cases of unreported missing persons when there is a history of family estrangement.  Due to the nature of the registry, families who have had a problematic relationship with someone who is abusive or has drug or mental problems and do not want anything to do with the Unreported Missing person, would not be likely to fill in the form and thus leaves out a large part of the unreported missing population from the research.

The Perception Project

This project, a collaboration with Lets Bring Them Home is specifically aimed at young people, students, artists and writers and asks for creative works which contain or define the word "lost" in them. They believe that the participation and definition of "lost" in this  project will shed light on the problem of unreported lost and missing children and adults to a population of people who would not normally have any contact with missing people and in particular Unreported missing or Kids off the Grid.

Education

The charity provides training and free guides to Law Enforcement, Social Workers, Educators, Health Care Workers, Mental Health Workers, Homeless Services, Drug & Alcohol Recovery Providers and Youth.

Links to Other Organizations

 Project EDAN: Project EDAN was formed in conjunction with and is co-sponsored by Outpost For Hope.
 Doe Network: Outpost For Hope founder Libba Phillips is also Northern California Area Director for the Doe Network. 
 Lets Bring Them Home: These two organizations have collaborated on the awareness campaign "Perception Project".

References 

Law enforcement websites
501(c)(3) organizations
Missing people organizations